Courtney Watson (born September 18, 1980 in Sarasota, Florida) is a former American football linebacker who played in the NFL for two seasons with the New Orleans Saints, who drafted him in the second round of the 2004 NFL Draft out of the University of Notre Dame.

High school career
Courtney Watson played high school football at Riverview High School in Sarasota. Watson played wide receiver as a freshman and sophomore, before switching to running back in his junior season. In his first year at the position, he rushed for more than 1,100 yards, earning All-League and All-Sarasota honors, while also being awarded team Most Valuable Player. As a senior, Watson rushed for 1,220 yards on 133 carries (9.2 yards per carry) and scored 15 touchdowns, while also handling kickoff and punt return duties and serving as a team captain. At the end of the season, he received All-League and All-Sarasota honors, he was named team MVP for a second straight year and he was selected to play in the Florida Shrine Bowl. While at Riverview he also competed in basketball, captaining the team as a senior and twice earning All-League and All-Sarasota honors, and he was a member of the track and field team.

College career
In 1999 Courtney Watson enrolled at the University of Notre Dame to play for head coach Bob Davie and the Fighting Irish football team. He was redshirted his freshman year while being converted into a linebacker. In 2000 Watson spent most of his time on special teams, while serving as a backup to All-American linebacker Anthony Denman. After Denman got drafted by the Jacksonville Jaguars in the 2001 NFL Draft, Watson received the starting job for the 2001 season. In the season opener against Nebraska, in his first career start, he recorded 18 tackles and he was named MVP of the game. He ended the season second on the team in tackles (76) and tackles for loss (13). In 2002 Watson led the team in tackles (90) and he was tied for second on the team in tackles for loss (10) and interceptions (4). In his final season at Notre Dame, in 2003, he led again the team in tackles (117) and he was second on the team in tackles for loss (15).

Professional career
Courtney Watson was drafted in the second round of the 2004 NFL Draft by the New Orleans Saints and he signed a five-year, $2.98 million contract with the team. 
In the season opener of the 2004 NFL Season he recorded 11 tackles. He ended the season with 57 tackles and two sacks in twelve games (eight starts). In the 2005 NFL Season he played in nine games, with six starts, recording 37 tackles and one sack.
During the 2006 offseason, he was traded to the Miami Dolphins for linebacker Eddie Moore.
However, this trade was rejected when Eddie Moore failed a physical for the Saints. On June 6, 2006 Watson was traded to the Buffalo Bills in exchange for TE Tim Euhus. On August 22, 2006, he was released by the Bills. He was picked up by the Houston Texans two days later. However, he was released by the team before the start of the season.

References

External links
 Saints linebacker arrested on DWI charge
 NFL.com: Courtney Watson
 New Orleans Saints official site profile: Courtney Watson
 NFL.com Draft Profile: Courtney Watson
 DatabaseFootball.com: Courtney Watson

1980 births
American football linebackers
Living people
New Orleans Saints players
Notre Dame Fighting Irish football players
Riverview High School (Sarasota, Florida) alumni